Bihar Colony is a neighbourhood locality in Lyari Town, located in the Karachi South district of Karachi, Pakistan.

Geo links

References

Neighbourhoods of Karachi
Lyari Town
Ethnic enclaves in Pakistan